Dharti is a 1970 Indian Hindi-language action film directed by C. V. Sridhar. It stars Rajendra Kumar, Waheeda Rehman in lead roles. It is a remake of the 1969 Tamil language film Sivandha Mann.

Plot 
Vasantpur is a small princely state adjacent to India. It is ruled by a kind king, but his general, Diwan, who is a cruel man, is planning to take over Vasantpur with the help of Dutch powers. Meanwhile, the King's Inspector General Chandrashekhar's son, Bharat gets his higher education from Switzerland. There, he meets the King's daughter, Jwala alias Chitralekha. They both fall in love. After some time, Bharat gets a message from his fellow friends that Vasantpur is falling into the clutches of cruel Diwan and he hurries to Vasantpur with Jwala. Following their adventures, they take Dikky and Rosey under their wing. When their two attempts to kill Diwan are foiled, they devise a plan to kill Diwan in his own palace. But the cruel Diwan has imprisoned Chandrashekhar and the King and is going to become Vasantpur's king. Now what does fate have in store for Bharat and all of Vasantpur?

Cast 
Rajendra Kumar as Bharat
Waheeda Rehman as Princess Chitralekha / Jwala
Sivaji Ganesan , Great Tespian as Anand. He played the role of Bharat (hero) in the original Tamil version, Sivandha Mann 
Kumkum as Rosy
Balraj Sahni as IG Chandrashekhar
Ajit as Diwan
Kamini Kaushal as Janki

Rajendranath as Dikki
Sudesh Kumar as Ranjeet
Pahari Sanyal as King of Vasantpur

Soundtrack 
The soundtrack was composed by Shankar Jaikishan.

References

External links 
 

1970 action films
1970 films
1970s Hindi-language films
Films directed by C. V. Sridhar
Films scored by Shankar–Jaikishan
Hindi remakes of Tamil films
Hindi-language action films
Indian action films